Indore-4 Assembly constituency is one of the 230 Vidhan Sabha (Legislative Assembly) constituencies of Madhya Pradesh state in central India.

Overview 

Indore-4 Assembly constituency is one of the 8 Vidhan Sabha constituencies located in Indore district which comes under Indore (Lok Sabha constituency). Constituency includes Wards 22, 23, 46-56 and 66 of Indore city.

Members of Legislative Assembly

See also

 Indore
 Indore (Lok Sabha constituency)

References

Politics of Indore
Assembly constituencies of Madhya Pradesh